USS Elliot (DD-967) was a  in the United States Navy. Built by the Ingalls Shipbuilding Division of Litton Industries at Pascagoula, Mississippi, the ship was named for Lieutenant Commander Arthur J. Elliot II, USN (1933–1968), who as commanding officer of Patrol Boat River Squadron 57, was killed in action in the Republic of Vietnam on 29 December 1968.

1977 – 1981 

Elliot got underway on 24 January 1977 for her maiden voyage, transiting from Pascagoula, Mississippi, to San Diego, California, via the Panama Canal. She was assigned to the U.S. Pacific Fleet as a unit of Destroyer Squadron 9 (DesRon 9), under the administrative control of Commander, Cruiser Destroyer Group Five and Commander, Naval Surface Forces Pacific. After arrival, Elliot conducted five weeks of shakedown training and participated in a combat exercise. Following these evolutions, she returned to her builders for a post shakedown yard availability.

After leaving the yard, Elliot sailed to Rockland, Maine arriving on 25 August. Neighboring Thomaston was the hometown of the sailor for whom the ship was named. During a four-day stay, the ship hosted several thousand guests and embarked 650 guests for a six-hour guest cruise. On 24 September Elliot reported to Long Beach Naval Shipyard for a six-month restricted yard availability during which her NATO Sea Sparrow and Harpoon missile systems were installed.

On 1 August 1978 Elliot shifted from the operational command of Destroyer Squadron Nine to Destroyer Squadron 31 (DesRon 31). Elliot departed for her first deployment, a seven-month Western Pacific tour, on 21 February 1979 as flagship of DesRon 31 in company with the aircraft carrier . On 31 March, Elliot departed Subic Bay, Philippines with Ranger, for operations in the Indian Ocean. Less than a week later, Elliot was transiting the Strait of Malacca in lead of Ranger when the carrier was involved in a collision with the oil tanker M/V Fortune resulting in the carrier having to return to Subic Bay for repairs. Elliot arrived in Diego Garcia on 12 April. Elliot returned to Subic Bay on 15 June. Elliot was awarded the Navy Expeditionary Medal for Indian Ocean contingency operations. Elliot arrived back at her homeport from her first deployment on 9 September 1979. Also notable on this deployment was Elliot tailing Soviet carrier Minsk for five days of observation of operations. 

Elliot began her second deployment in 1980. On 23 January 1981, Elliot suffered a main bearing casualty resulting in one of her gas turbine engines having to be replaced. This replacement was completed at Subic Bay in 2 days. On 21 April Elliot encountered the first of several refugee boats. Over the next eight days Elliot picked up 158 refugees for which the crew was awarded the Humanitarian Service Medal. Port visits on this deployment included stops in Hawaii, Guam, Korea, Thailand, Hong Kong, Philippines, Japan, and Singapore. She returned from this deployment on 23 May.

1981 – 1985 

On 1 June 1981 Elliot was transferred to Destroyer Squadron 21. Elliot reported to Todd Pacific Shipyard in Seattle, Washington on 17 August for the first private sector overhaul ever conducted of a Spruance-class destroyer. Among other refurbishments and installations during this overhaul Elliot received an SLQ-32(V)2 electronic warfare system. Elliot completed overhaul on 30 April 1982. She returned to her homeport of NS San Diego on 21 May. On 1 July Elliot was reassigned from DesRon 21 to DesRon 17.

Elliot departed San Diego, California on 13 April 1983 for the third deployment of her career. Port visits on this deployment included stops in Hawaii, Philippines, Korea, Japan, Thailand, Guam and Hong Kong. On 31 July, a small boat was spotted by the forward lookout. A total of 68 Vietnamese refugees were subsequently rescued and were turned over to state officials in Subic Bay. Elliot was again awarded the Humanitarian Service Medal for her rescue operation. During August, Elliot endured being at sea through the combined forces of two typhoons, though no significant damage resulted. On 1 September, Elliot departed Sasebo, Japan on four hours' notice, to respond to the downing of KAL 007.
 
and arrived approximately 48 hours later, the first Allied ship on station. "Elliot" remained on scene until 14 September along with other units of Allied nations (U.S., Korea, Japan). During the tense days immediately after the downing, "Elliot" encountered some thirty-two Soviet ships in the SAS area, most of which were men-of-war. "Elliot" and all Soviet combatant ships were at a continuous state of General Quarters (Battle Stations), with deck weapons ready to fire. Elliot returned from her third deployment on 18 November 1983.

On 27 January 1984, Elliot conducted a safe weapons offload at the Seal Beach Naval Weapons Station. Shortly after departing this facility, Elliot struck a subsurface obstruction in the Seal Beach channel, causing some limited damage to the underwater hull and the starboard propeller. On 2 February, Elliot commenced a planned three-month selected repair availability (SRA) period in San Diego. On 30 April, Elliot proceeded to the Todd Shipyard facilities in San Pedro, California for repairs to her starboard propeller and sonar dome. In May, Elliot shifted operational command to Destroyer Squadron 5. In October, Elliot participated in Fleet Week '84 festivities with 18 other ships in San Francisco, California. Elliot hosted more than 10,000 visitors during this event.

1985 – 2003 

On 10 July 1985, Elliot departed on her fourth deployment as part of the  battle group. Port visits on this deployment included stops in Hawaii, Japan, Korea, Philippines, Brunei, and Hong Kong. In mid-September Elliot was engaged in an exercise with Republic of Korea ships. On 1 December Elliot departed Subic Bay in company with the  battle group for transit to Pearl Harbor, Hawaii arriving on 12 December. Elliot returned to her San Diego homeport on 21 December, ending her fourth deployment.

In May 1986 Elliot began a two-month selected repair availability which included installation of flight deck modifications necessary to support LAMPS Mk III helicopter operations. On 11 October Elliot arrived at San Francisco to participate in Fleet Week '87
 
festivities.

In January 1987, Elliot departed on her fifth deployment. Highlights off this deployment included operations in the Bering Strait.

Elliot received a major overhaul in the 1988 / 1989 time frame, receiving, among other things, VLS, Phalanx CIWS, new TACAN and an upgraded Sea Sparrow system including MK 23 TAS radar.

Elliot departed San Diego on 9 September 1989 to participate in PACEX-89, said to be the largest major naval exercise in the Pacific since the close of World War II.Elliot's course took it north to the Gulf of Alaska, then on to the Bering Sea, the northwest Pacific, East China Sea, and the Sea of Japan. Elliot made its sole port stop at Sasebo, Japan before returning home on 9 November 1989. During PACEX-89, Elliot conducted joint operations with other units of the Pacific Fleet as well as elements of the Japanese Maritime Self Defense Force. Elliot and its battlegroup were also overflown by two Soviet TU-95 Bear D reconnaissance aircraft. Another highlight was the group photograph Elliot participated in as one of fifty ships gathered in formation.

Elliot departed San Diego for WestPac-90 on 1 February 1990 as part of the  Carrier Battlegroup "Charlie." Ports visited included Pearl Harbor, Hawaii; Pusan, Korea; Subic Bay, Philippines; Singapore; Pattaya Beach, Thailand; Diego Garcia, BIOT; Muscat, Oman; Fremantle; and Hong Kong. Elliot also participated in Team Spirit 1990 exercises with the South Korean military.

While transiting the South China Sea on 20 April 1990, Elliot rescued 35 Vietnamese refugees left adrift in a derelict boat and claiming to be the victims of pirates. Elliot's captain, CDR Timothy LaFleur, made the determination to embark the refugees and scuttle their boat. After the refugees were fed and clothed (many in clothes donated by crewmembers), Elliot turned them over to a representative of the United Nations High Commission for Refugees in Singapore on 21 April.

Elliot returned from deployment on 1 August 1990, one day before Iraq invaded Kuwait. Elliot then entered the NASSCO yards on 9 September 1990 and remained there until 17 December, thus spending the majority of the Persian Gulf War on the sidelines.

Elliot deployed for WestPac-91 on 31 July 1991 with COMDESRON 17 embarked. Port visits were made to Pearl Harbor; Subic Bay; Phuket, Thailand; Bahrain; Oman; Abu Dhabi, UAE; and Hong Kong. On 21 October, while deployed off the coast of Kuwait, Elliot was alerted by the French DGSE ship Le Berry to the presence of a drifting Iraqi LUGM-145 mine approximately 12 nm offshore from Kuwait's Mina Al-Ahmadi port. Explosive Ordnance Disposal Mobile Unit One, Detachment 31 team members were flown in from Bahrain. With the assistance of Elliot's air detachment the mine was safely detonated, resulting in a plume of water hundreds of feet tall. Elliot spent the Christmas holiday in Hong Kong before returning to San Diego on 20 January 1992.

Elliot reported to Southwest Marine Shipyard, San Diego in May 1992 for a yard period where she remained until August. On 16 November Elliot departed San Diego for a five-week counter narcotics cruise. This cruise included a port stop in Puerto Vallarta, Mexico. Elliot returned from this cruise on 21 December.

In June 1993, Elliot arrived in Portland, Oregon for the Portland Rose Festival. On 9 July Elliot departed San Diego for her next deployment. Port visits on this deployment included Hawaii, Guam, Singapore, United Arab Emirates, Bahrain, Diego Garcia, Australia, and Fiji. By late August, Elliot was operating off the coast of Iran. Elliot continued operating in this region into November, serving as anti-air warfare commander and Persian Gulf force over-the-horizon track coordinator for portions of this time period. She also frequently conducted contingency strike operations exercises. During these operations, Elliot participated in boardings of merchant vessels in support of United Nations Security Council resolutions.

[1993-2003]

Elliot operated out of San Diego, California until she was decommissioned on 2 December 2003.

Awards
 Navy Unit Commendation – (Aug 1998)
 Navy Meritorious Unit Commendation – (Sep 1983, Sep 1989 – Jul 1990, Dec 1992 – May 1993, Jan 1999 – Sep 2001)
 Battle "E" – (1979, 1981, 1992, 1993)
 Navy Expeditionary Medal – (Apr–Jun 1979)
 Southwest Asia Service Medal – (Sep–Dec 1991)
 Humanitarian Service Medal – (21–27 Apr 1981, 31 Jul 1983)

Gallery

References

External links

 
 navsource.org: USS Elliot
 united-states-navy.com: USS Elliot
 unofficial USS Elliot website
 Elliot decommissions article from Navy News
 c7f.navy.mil: Operation Talisman Sabre 2005
 militarynews.com: USS Elliot sunk by VFA-195 jets (pdf)

 

Spruance-class destroyers
Cold War destroyers of the United States
1974 ships
Ships sunk as targets